Anthony Graeme Bowman Perks FRCS FRACS (born October 1955) is a British plastic surgeon, and the former president of the British Association of Plastic, Reconstructive and Aesthetic Surgeons (BAPRAS). He was specialist in microsurgical reconstruction after cancer surgery, and the former head of the Department of Plastic, Reconstructive and Burns Surgery at Nottingham University Hospitals NHS Trust.

Career
Perks qualified as a surgeon in England and is a fellow of the Royal College of Surgeons (FRCS). He later practised in Australia and became a fellow of the Royal Australasian College of Surgeons (FRACS). In the 1990s he returned to the United Kingdom and became the head of the Department of Plastic, Reconstructive and Burns Surgery at Nottingham University Hospitals NHS Trust. 

He is a specialist in microsurgical reconstruction after cancer surgery, In 2019, he called for greater evidence to be produced to establish the causes of what has been called breast implant illness (BII), saying of BII that it was in the patient's head and not in their breasts. He is the former president of the British Association of Plastic, Reconstructive and Aesthetic Surgeons (BAPRAS).

He retired at the end of 2020.

Personal life 
Perks lives with his wife and one of their four children in Halam Hill, Halam, Nottinghamshire.

Selected publications
 "A Prospective Assessment of Shoulder Morbidity and Recovery Time Scales following Latissimus Dorsi Breast Reconstruction", Plastic and Reconstructive Surgery, Vol. 122, No. 5 (November 2008), pp. 1334-40. (Joint author) doi: 10.1097/PRS.0b013e3181881ffe
 Pathways in Prosthetic Joint Infection. Oxford University Press, Oxford, 2018. (Joint author) 
 "In search of evidence-based plastic surgery: the problems faced by the specialty". British Journal of Plastic Surgery, Vol. 53, No. 5 (July 2000), pp. 427-433.

References

External links 

Graeme Perks: Its Better to be a Lucky Surgeon than a Good One!

Living people
1955 births
British plastic surgeons
Fellows of the Royal College of Surgeons
Fellows of the Royal Australasian College of Surgeons